Lloyd P. Jordan (December 14, 1900 – February 24, 1990) was an American football, basketball, and baseball player, coach, and college athletics administrator.  He served as the head football coach at Amherst College from 1932 to 1949 and at Harvard University from 1950 to 1956, compiling a career college football record of 101–72–8.  Jordan was also the head basketball coach at Colgate University from 1928 to 1932 and at Amherst from 1932 to 1948, tallying a career college basketball mark of 159–103.  He played football, basketball, and baseball at the University of Pittsburgh, from which he graduated in 1924.  He served as the commissioner of the Southern Conference from 1960 to 1974.  Jordan was inducted into the College Football Hall of Fame as a coach in 1978.

Head coaching record

Football

References

External links
 

1900 births
1990 deaths
American men's basketball players
Amherst Mammoths athletic directors
Amherst Mammoths football coaches
Amherst Mammoths men's basketball coaches
Colgate Raiders football coaches
Colgate Raiders men's basketball coaches
Harvard Crimson football coaches
Pittsburgh Panthers baseball players
Pittsburgh Panthers football players
Pittsburgh Panthers men's basketball players
Southern Conference commissioners
College Football Hall of Fame inductees
United States Navy officers
United States Navy personnel of World War II
People from Punxsutawney, Pennsylvania
Coaches of American football from Pennsylvania
Players of American football from Pennsylvania
Basketball coaches from Pennsylvania
Basketball players from Pennsylvania
Military personnel from Pennsylvania